Seahaven is an American band from Torrance, California.

Biography
The band formed in 2009. They have released three full-length albums and two EPs. They released their first full-length album titled Winter Forever in 2011. Three years later they released their second full-length album, Reverie Lagoon: Music For Escapism Only. The album received generally positive reviews, being awarded four stars out of five by both Alter the Press and New Noise Magazine.

They are currently signed to Run For Cover Records.

On June 16, 2016, they released their first single from their untitled third record (as yet unreleased) called "Find A Way".

On April 17, 2018, Kyle Soto released an ep with his new project, “Welcome Cafe”.

On August 2, 2018, Seahaven announced that they would be supporting Man Overboard on its 10-year anniversary tour.

Seahaven played a show in Los Angeles on December 26, 2018, putting to rest any rumors that the band broke up.

On October 6, 2020, they released their first single "Moon", from their new record "Halo of Hurt", to be released on November 20, 2020.

On November 20, 2020, Seahaven released their long awaited third studio album "Halo of Hurt" on Pure Noise Records. Frontman Kyle Soto commented on the latest release, stating, “I wanted to bring it back to the beginning of the band — a revived version of our younger selves in my garage in 2009. No timelines, no pressure. No need to fit a certain mold.”

Members
Current members
Kyle Soto - vocals, guitar,
Cody Christian - guitar
Mike DeBartolo - bass, vocals, piano 
Eric Findlay - drums, bass on Ghost

Former members
Michael Craver - guitarist
James Phillips - drums, vocals
Hunter Babcock
Joseph "Pepe" Luttrell - guitarist

Discography
Studio albums
Winter Forever (2011)
Reverie Lagoon: Music for Escapism Only (2014)
Halo of Hurt (2020)
EPs
Ghost/Acoustic (2010)
Acoustic Sessions (2011)
Singles
Silhouette (Latin Skin) (2014)
Find A Way (2016)
Moon (2020)
Harbor (2020)
Bait (2020)

References

External links
Official website
Facebook
Twitter
Allmusic
Discogs

Musical groups established in 2009
Musical groups from California
Run for Cover Records artists